The River City Rivalry is the name given to the Cincinnati–Pittsburgh football rivalry. It was an annual game played between former Big East rivals University of Pittsburgh and University of Cincinnati. The rivalry itself was relatively brief, played annually from 2005, during which season the rivalry trophy was introduced. Before the rivalry was titled, the two teams played each other in 1921, 1922, 1979, and 1981. The rivalry went on hiatus, like many others throughout the country, in the aftermath of the 2010–14 NCAA conference realignment, which left the programs in separate leagues.  However, the two teams are scheduled to meet in a home-and-home series for the 2023 and 2024 seasons. It will be Cincinnati's debut season in the Big 12  resulting in a defacto ACC/Big 12 showdown.

Paddlewheel Trophy
The Paddlewheel Trophy is the rivalry trophy that was created in 2005 when the Bearcats joined the Big East Conference to which the Pittsburgh Panthers already belonged. Prior to 2005, the teams had met previously on only four prior occasions, most recently in 1981. However, the teams decided to create a trophy that would help their new conference rivalry grow and reflect the sports rivalry that already existed between the cities' professional football and baseball teams. The trophy is designed and named in honor the historic link between the cities from the days in the 19th and early-20th centuries when Paddle wheel-powered boats traveled between the two cities along the Ohio River. Mounted on the base is an authentic brass, engine-room telegraph that is a working model that was set for use on a ship in Seattle, Washington. The face of the trophy's telegraph was redesigned with logos from both teams on either side that can light up. The lever can be pulled to the side of the school who has won which also causes the ringing of bells. The front includes a steel plate featuring a carved outline of Allegheny, Monongahela Rivers and Ohio River as it runs from Pittsburgh to Cincinnati. The  base is made out of Ipê wood. The trophy was designed by the architectural firm of Robert Busch and Karl Wallick, the steel plate was manufactured by Vulkane of Cincinnati, and the remaining trophy was manufactured by Trophy Awards Manufacturing. Over 175 man-hours of design and labor went into its construction.

History
Cincinnati and Pittsburgh have been historic rivals in many facets, first as economic centers along the Ohio River as mass migration in the United States headed westward. Within the sports world, the Cincinnati Reds and Pittsburgh Pirates have maintained a heated rivalry at times, frequently facing off in the MLB playoffs during the 1970s. In the NFL, the Cincinnati Bengals and Pittsburgh Steelers have been division rivals and have had a fiery rivalry since their first game. 

When Cincinnati joined the Big East in 2005 the theoretical rivalry with Pittsburgh was pounced upon. Assisted in this was the comparative talent between the two programs during this time, which came to a peak in what was essentially the Big East Championship Game when the teams met in 2009.

Notable Games
October 20, 2007: The No. 23 Bearcats entered the matchup at 6–1 fresh off a tough loss to Louisville. The Panthers' run game was tenacious with two players rushing for over 100 yards and Cincinnati QB Ben Mauk's 3 turnovers in the 4th quarter leading to a second straight loss and drop out of the rankings for the Bearcats.

December 5, 2009: The 2009 matchup between Cincinnati and Pittsburgh was described by one national columnist as the most "fascinating game I've ever seen." The game functioned as a Big East championship game, with Cincinnati entering first in the conference, and Pittsburgh at second. Additionally, the Bearcats entered the game undefeated and trying to earn a spot in the BCS National Championship Game, while the 9–2 Panthers were trying to secure their first BCS bowl since the 2004 season. The Panthers had an early 31–10 lead, however, the ensuing kickoff was returned for a touchdown by Mardy Gilyard to make it a 31–17 game at halftime. Cincinnati completed the comeback, tying the game at 38 late in the 4th quarter. Pittsburgh running back Dion Lewis scored a touchdown with 1:36 left in the game, but a mishandled snap by Andrew Janocko prevented the Panthers from converting the extra point. The Bearcats then drove down the field and scored on a 29-yard touchdown pass from Tony Pike to Armon Binns with 33 seconds left. Bearcats kicker Jake Rodgers converted the extra point attempt, and Cincinnati held on to win 45–44. Following the game, Cincinnati rose to a #3 ranking in the final BCS standing while Pitt dropped to #17. The game has been described as "one of the most crushing losses in the history of Pitt football."

Game results

Source:

See also  
 List of NCAA college football rivalry games
 Bengals–Steelers rivalry

References

College football rivalries in the United States
Pittsburgh Panthers football
Cincinnati Bearcats football
Recurring sporting events established in 1921